Risdon Zinc Works (trading as Nyrstar Hobart) is a major zinc refinery located in Lutana, a suburb of Hobart, Tasmania, Australia. The smelter is one of the world’s largest in terms of production volume, producing over  annually of high-grade zinc, primarily as die-cast alloys and continuous galvanising-grade alloys. These products are exported for global markets and utilised in a wide range of industries and products, from building and infrastructure to transportation, business equipment, communications, electronics, and consumer goods.
The facility produces zinc using the Roast, Leach, Electrowinning (RLE) method, creating leach byproducts, including cadmium, gypsum, copper sulphate, lead sulphate, sulphuric acid, paragoethite and leach concentrate.
The refinery has been owned and operated by the global multi-metals business Nyrstar since 2007. Nyrstar Hobart works closely with the Nyrstar Port Pirie multi-metals smelter in South Australia. The facility is Tasmania's largest exporter, contributing 25% of the state's overall export value in 2013.

History
Founder James H. Gillies came to Hobart in 1908 with plans to build a zinc refinery and a hydroelectric facility, the latter of which would produce the electricity needed for a refinery's electrolytic process. Gillies purchased land south of Hobart at Electrona in 1909 with the intention of constructing an electrolytic zinc plant as well as other high energy uses, such as the manufacturing of calcium carbide. Gillies founded the Hydro-Electric Power and Metallurgical Company, and was given permission by the Tasmanian government to build a dam and power plant in the centre of the state using water from the Great Lake. Lack of funding prevented the construction of the dam and power plant, which was eventually taken over by the Tasmanian Government in 1914. Despite Gillies' continuing efforts to construct a zinc and carbide facility at Electrona, only the carbide factory was completed.

Zinc works construction

The majority of Britain's supplies came from Germany and Belgium, but when the First World War broke out, zinc metal became a scarcity throughout the British Empire, which was needed to manufacture weapons. When Germany invaded Belgium, the price of zinc soared by 312 times.

Construction of the Risdon Zinc Works by EZ Industries commenced in 1916. It opened in 1918. The operations of the Risdon Zinc Works were tied in with the mining of zinc in Rosebery and Williamsford.

Amalgamated Zinc Limited began looking into the production of electrolytic zinc after acquiring thousands of tonnes of high-zinc concentrate in Broken Hill. The company's general manager, Herbert Gepp, was tasked with looking into the procedure when he was in America looking for markets for concentrate. Because of Tasmania's commitment in supplying cheap hydroelectric power, the corporation decided to establish a site there and signed a contract with the government for the delivery of power.
During the 1920s the facility saw rapid expansion, becoming the world's largest zinc smelter, a title it held until the late 1930s.

The settlement of the suburb of Risdon was almost exclusively that of EZ workers. Pollution from the works was an issue for the company, and successor companies that operated the works as well as disposal of waste out to sea.

In 1924, the facility began manufacturing superphosphate for the fertiliser industry. Roasting furnaces were built to produce the sulphur dioxide needed to make sulphuric acid. The production of ammonium sulphate began as a means to utilise the sulphuric acid produced as an onsite byproduct.

Later expansion
By the mid 1970s, the smelter was exporting seventy-percent of its production overseas.

Ownership
The Risdon Zinc Works works were included in the sale of EZ Industries to North Broken Hill Peko in 1984. The smelter has subsequently been operated by Pasminco, Zinifex and since 2007 by Nyrstar.

Pollution

Historically, run-off from outdoor stockpiles of smelter production contaminated soil on the site, surrounding suburbs and the River Derwent. The smelter's discharging of methylmercury (mercury) and other toxic heavy metals into the Derwent estuary greatly contributed in creating one of the most polluted river systems in the world by the close of the 1970s.
Deposits of zinc, mercury, cadmium and lead, which are harmful to marine life and accumulate in seafood continue to plague the river greatly due to legacy pollution.

Monitoring
As part of their operating permit conditions with the Environment Protection Authority, Nyrstar are required to monitor levels of toxic heavy metal in marine life sourced within the Derwent estuary, including oysters, mussels and flathead.
Data is collected from the river every five years, with monitoring extending from New Norfolk out to the Iron Pot, with Storm Bay and the neighbouring D'Entrecasteaux Channel excluded from investigation. 2016 statistics revealed that bream and shellfish caught in the river could not be consumed due to high mercury levels.

Groundwater Interception System
Developed in collaboration with GHD Group, a Groundwater Interception System (GIS) was constructed in 2010.
The total length of the free draining bores is little under . The neighbouring wastewater treatment facility receives the system's discharge. The system was designed to be low maintenance, containing no pumps or electrical power.

Upgrades
In order to treat a larger spectrum of metals, Nyrstar invested $52 million to modernise the facility in 2015. With the Tasmanian Government serving as guarantee, the Australian Government's Export Finance and Insurance Corporation authorised a $29 million loan to be used for the refurbishment.
In 2022, the Albanese Government contributed $50 million of an estimated $400 million modernisation of the smelter.

Incidents
In 2012, residents of Lutana, Cornelian Bay, Risdon and Lindisfarne were forced to stay indoors following a gas leak attributed to a defective transformer at the smelter, emitting sulphur trioxide and sulphur dioxide. Some areas of the smelter were also evacuated. In 2017, a worker was severely burnt in an explosion whilst overseeing the production of zinc sheets within the electrolysis department. In 2019, a worker with over thirty years experience died at the refinery in an area of the plant susceptible to sulphur dioxide. Nyrstar offered counselling for workers, however the coroner's report revealed that the man had died of natural causes. In 2020, two workers were fired following a brawl in the workplace tearoom.

Community interaction
Nyrstar Hobart opened the site to the public as part of the 2012 Open Doors initiative. In 2013, management began prioritising visitors, encouraging educational institutions and school group to tour the facility. Nyrstar further launched The Big Picture campaign in late 2013, promoting the smelter on billboard and television ads, a website, and social media to emphasise the significance of its smelter operations to the Tasmanian economy.

Access
The main Risdon Zinc Works entrance is located on Risdon Road. The northern entrance is accessible via Derwent Park Road.

References

External links
Nyrstar Hobart

Australian companies established in 1918
Companies based in Tasmania
Buildings and structures in Hobart
Recipients of Engineers Australia engineering heritage markers
Risdon, Tasmania
1918 establishments in Australia